Gerardina Tjaberta van Ysselsteyn (1892 – 1975) was a Dutch art historian and textile specialist who wrote several books on the Dutch textile industry.

Van Ysselsteyn was born in Rotterdam as the daughter of the civil engineer , Minister of Agriculture and Economics of the Netherlands from 1918 to 1922, after whom the village of Ysselsteyn has been named.

In 1931, van Ysselsteyn conjectured that the Huguenot tract Vindiciae contra tyrannos published in 1579, whose authorship is still unclear, was a collaboration between Hubert Languet and Philippe de Mornay.

Publications
 

 
 Europees porselein : de geschiedenis van een geheim en zijn toepassing, 1949
 White figured linen damask: From the 15th to the beginning of the 19th century, 1962

 De wandtapijten in het stadhuis van Maastricht (The tapestries in the Town Hall of Maastricht), 1972

References

 Author page in the Digital Library for Dutch Literature

1892 births
1970 deaths
Dutch art historians
Dutch women writers
Writers from Rotterdam
Women art historians